The 2013 Volta a Portugal was a men's road bicycle race held from 7 to 18 August 2013. It was the 75th edition of the men's stage race to be held, which was established in 1927. As part of the 2013 UCI Europe Tour, it is rated as a 2.1 event.
The Spanish cyclist Alejandro Marque from OFM-Quinta da Lixa won the race.

Schedule

Participating teams
In total, 17 teams are set to compete.
National teams:

LA-Antarte
Louletano-Dunas Douradas
OFM-Quinta da Lixa
Rádio Popular-Onda
International teams:

Astana Continental Team

Classification leadership

References

External links

2013
Volta a Portugal
Volta a Portugal